The Fussball Club Basel 1893 1987–88 season was their 94th season since the club's foundation. It was their 42nd consecutive season in the top flight of Swiss football (Nationalliga A) since they achieved promotion in the 1945–46 season. FC Basel played their home games in the St. Jakob Stadium. Charles Röthlisberger was the club's newly appointed chairman.  He was the club's 31st chairman in their history.

Overview

Pre-season
Following the poor previous season, as the team only escaped relegation in the play-out round, Helmut Benthaus retired as head coach and there were also a number of players who left the club. Former Swiss international midfielder René Botteron retired from active football. German former international Gerhard Strack returned to Germany to play for Fortuna Düsseldorf. Another German player also moved to Germany, Thomas Süss moved on to play for Karlsruher SC. French player Jean-Pierre François moved back to France to play for AS Saint-Étienne. Also Fredy Grossenbacher and Marco Schällibaum both moved to Servette, André Ladner moved to Lugano and Erni Maissen transferred to Young Boys. Further reserve goalkeeper Patrick Mäder moved on to Baden and Luiz Gonçalo moved on to Old Boys.

Urs Siegenthaler was appointed as new first team coach and because 11 players left the squad he had to build a new team. But the club was suffering financial difficulties and there was no money to spend. However, one interesting transfer was that of Scottish Gordon Smith coming from Admira Wacker. Another interesting transfer was that of German Uwe Dittus from FC Winterslag. Another two experienced players were Frank Eggeling joined from Grenchen and Ruedi Zahner from Aarau. All other new players were youngsters, goalkeeper Bernard Pulver joined from lower tier FC Bern, Peter Bernauer from German team SV 08 Laufenburg, Remo Steiner from local club FC Aesch, Ralph Thoma from local club FC Rheinfelden, Mathias Wehrli from local club FC Laufen. Six players were brought up from the youth team. These being Philipp Baumberger, Massimo Ceccaroni, Bernd Schramm, Adrian Sedlo, Fotios Karapetsas and Patrick Rahmen.

Another interesting transfer was that of Varadaraju Sundramoorthy from Singapore FA. Sundramoorthy became only the second player from Singapore to play in Europe when he signed during the winter break and one of the first Asian players to play in Switzerland. He is widely touted as one of the country's most skillful and talented footballers ever. Sundramoorthy had problems adapting to European football, he did not have the stamina and strength to play the entire 90 minutes and manager Siegenthaler used him as a substitute because he had the skills to decide a match.

Domestic league
The Swiss Football Association (SFV) had changed the form of the domestic league for this season. The number of teams in the Nationalliga A had been reduced from 16 to 12 and in the Nationalliga B had been increased from 16 to 24, these were divided into two regional groups. The top eight teams after the first stage would compete the second stage as championship group. The last four teams would compete the second stage in two promotion/relegation groups with the top six teams from each of the two Nationalliga B groups. Basel started the season badly, losing the first five league games straight off, conceding 17 goals, scoring just three. In the third round on 15 August they were defeated 1–9 by Xamax. Up until today this is still the highest score defeat that Basel have suffered in their domestic league history. Xamax manager at that time was Gilbert Gress. The goal scorers were 2x Robert Lüthi, 2x Robert Lei-Ravello, 2x Beat Sutter, 2x Heinz Hermann and Alain Geiger. The only goal for Basel was scored by Ralph Thoma.

The team never recovered from the bad start and even lost seven of the eleven return games. They ended the qualifying stage of the championship with just 13 points in 11th position. This meant that they had to play in one of the two promotion/relegation groups. Despite a good start in this phase, they won their first three matches, they were defeated by Bellinzona and then by Wettingen. Basel thus lost contact to these two teams in the top two positions in the league table. The first two places would qualify for next seasons top flight. In their last six games Basel could not achieve a single victory and therefore they slipped to fifth position in the table and were relegated to the Nationalliga B.

Xamax won the Swiss championship, second and third placed Servette and Aarau qualified for the 1988–89 UEFA Cup.

Swiss Cup
In the Swiss Cup, in round of 64, Basel were drawn against local rivals Old Boys. The game ended with a 1–2 defeat and therefore the cup season was ended much earlier than expected. In the final Grasshopper Club won the cup with a 2–0 victory over Schaffhausen and thus qualified for the 1988–89 Cup Winners' Cup.

Players 

 

 
 
 
 

 
 

 
 
 

 
 
 
 

Players who left the squad

Results 
Legend

Friendly matches

Pre- and mid-season

Winter break

Nationalliga A

First stage

League table

Second stage 
Promotion/relegation group A

League standings

Swiss Cup

See also
 History of FC Basel
 List of FC Basel players
 List of FC Basel seasons

References

Sources
 Rotblau: Jahrbuch Saison 2015/2016. Publisher: FC Basel Marketing AG. 
 Die ersten 125 Jahre. Publisher: Josef Zindel im Friedrich Reinhardt Verlag, Basel. 
 The FCB squad 1987–88 at fcb-archiv.ch
 1987–88 at RSSSF

External links
 FC Basel official site

FC Basel seasons
Basel